Law and Disorder in Johannesburg is a Louis Theroux documentary about the crime and private security situation in Johannesburg, South Africa. Theroux travels with heavily armed private security contractors who fill a security vacuum left by the government's inability to provide adequate security via normal means, such as policing. Theroux also meets with local people at the Black township level, who practice vigilantism against suspected criminals.

Reception

The Leicester Mercury described the programme as "a tense, depressing and occasionally gobsmacking film shot in a city plucked from the pages of some kind of dystopian novel."

See also
 Private security industry in South Africa
 Crime in South Africa

References

External links
 

Louis Theroux's BBC Two specials
BBC television documentaries
2008 television specials
Television episodes set in South Africa
BBC travel television series